The 1950–51 New York Rangers season was the franchise's 25th season. The Rangers finished with a 20–29–21 record in the regular season. They ended the season in fifth place with 61 points, and did not make the NHL playoffs.

Regular season

Final standings

Record vs. opponents

Schedule and results

|- align="center" bgcolor="#FFBBBB"
| 1 || 11 || @ Detroit Red Wings || 3–2 || 0–1–0
|- align="center" bgcolor="#CCFFCC"
| 2 || 15 || @ Chicago Black Hawks || 3–2 || 1–1–0
|- align="center" bgcolor="#FFBBBB"
| 3 || 19 || @ Montreal Canadiens || 4–0 || 1–2–0
|- align="center" bgcolor="#FFBBBB"
| 4 || 21 || @ Toronto Maple Leafs || 5–0 || 1–3–0
|- align="center" bgcolor="white"
| 5 || 22 || @ Boston Bruins || 0–0 || 1–3–1
|- align="center" bgcolor="white"
| 6 || 25 || Boston Bruins || 1–1 || 1–3–2
|- align="center" bgcolor="#FFBBBB"
| 7 || 28 || @ Montreal Canadiens || 5–1 || 1–4–2
|- align="center" bgcolor="white"
| 8 || 29 || Montreal Canadiens || 2–2 || 1–4–3
|-

|- align="center" bgcolor="white"
| 9 || 2 || @ Detroit Red Wings || 2–2 || 1–4–4
|- align="center" bgcolor="white"
| 10 || 4 || @ Toronto Maple Leafs || 2–2 || 1–4–5
|- align="center" bgcolor="#FFBBBB"
| 11 || 5 || @ Chicago Black Hawks || 3–1 || 1–5–5
|- align="center" bgcolor="#FFBBBB"
| 12 || 8 || Toronto Maple Leafs || 5–3 || 1–6–5
|- align="center" bgcolor="white"
| 13 || 11 || @ Montreal Canadiens || 1–1 || 1–6–6
|- align="center" bgcolor="#FFBBBB"
| 14 || 12 || Chicago Black Hawks || 4–1 || 1–7–6
|- align="center" bgcolor="#FFBBBB"
| 15 || 15 || Boston Bruins || 4–3 || 1–8–6
|- align="center" bgcolor="#FFBBBB"
| 16 || 18 || @ Toronto Maple Leafs || 5–4 || 1–9–6
|- align="center" bgcolor="white"
| 17 || 19 || Detroit Red Wings || 3–3 || 1–9–7
|- align="center" bgcolor="#CCFFCC"
| 18 || 22 || Montreal Canadiens || 3–2 || 2–9–7
|- align="center" bgcolor="white"
| 19 || 25 || @ Boston Bruins || 3–3 || 2–9–8
|- align="center" bgcolor="#FFBBBB"
| 20 || 26 || Toronto Maple Leafs || 3–2 || 2–10–8
|- align="center" bgcolor="white"
| 21 || 29 || Chicago Black Hawks || 1–1 || 2–10–9
|-

|- align="center" bgcolor="#CCFFCC"
| 22 || 2 || @ Boston Bruins || 3–2 || 3–10–9
|- align="center" bgcolor="#FFBBBB"
| 23 || 3 || Boston Bruins || 5–3 || 3–11–9
|- align="center" bgcolor="#FFBBBB"
| 24 || 6 || Detroit Red Wings || 9–0 || 3–12–9
|- align="center" bgcolor="#FFBBBB"
| 25 || 9 || @ Detroit Red Wings || 5–0 || 3–13–9
|- align="center" bgcolor="white"
| 26 || 10 || @ Chicago Black Hawks || 3–3 || 3–13–10
|- align="center" bgcolor="#CCFFCC"
| 27 || 13 || Montreal Canadiens || 3–2 || 4–13–10
|- align="center" bgcolor="white"
| 28 || 16 || @ Montreal Canadiens || 1–1 || 4–13–11
|- align="center" bgcolor="white"
| 29 || 17 || Detroit Red Wings || 3–3 || 4–13–12
|- align="center" bgcolor="white"
| 30 || 20 || Boston Bruins || 4–4 || 4–13–13
|- align="center" bgcolor="#CCFFCC"
| 31 || 24 || Chicago Black Hawks || 6–1 || 5–13–13
|- align="center" bgcolor="#FFBBBB"
| 32 || 25 || @ Detroit Red Wings || 4–1 || 5–14–13
|- align="center" bgcolor="#CCFFCC"
| 33 || 27 || Toronto Maple Leafs || 3–1 || 6–14–13
|- align="center" bgcolor="#CCFFCC"
| 34 || 31 || Boston Bruins || 3–0 || 7–14–13
|-

|- align="center" bgcolor="#FFBBBB"
| 35 || 1 || @ Boston Bruins || 3–2 || 7–15–13
|- align="center" bgcolor="#CCFFCC"
| 36 || 3 || Detroit Red Wings || 5–3 || 8–15–13
|- align="center" bgcolor="#CCFFCC"
| 37 || 6 || @ Toronto Maple Leafs || 4–2 || 9–15–13
|- align="center" bgcolor="#CCFFCC"
| 38 || 7 || Chicago Black Hawks || 3–2 || 10–15–13
|- align="center" bgcolor="#FFBBBB"
| 39 || 10 || Montreal Canadiens || 3–0 || 10–16–13
|- align="center" bgcolor="#FFBBBB"
| 40 || 13 || @ Detroit Red Wings || 4–2 || 10–17–13
|- align="center" bgcolor="#CCFFCC"
| 41 || 14 || Toronto Maple Leafs || 2–1 || 11–17–13
|- align="center" bgcolor="white"
| 42 || 17 || Boston Bruins || 3–3 || 11–17–14
|- align="center" bgcolor="white"
| 43 || 20 || @ Montreal Canadiens || 2–2 || 11–17–15
|- align="center" bgcolor="#FFBBBB"
| 44 || 21 || @ Boston Bruins || 5–1 || 11–18–15
|- align="center" bgcolor="#CCFFCC"
| 45 || 25 || @ Chicago Black Hawks || 2–1 || 12–18–15
|- align="center" bgcolor="#FFBBBB"
| 46 || 27 || @ Toronto Maple Leafs || 2–1 || 12–19–15
|- align="center" bgcolor="#CCFFCC"
| 47 || 28 || Detroit Red Wings || 5–3 || 13–19–15
|-

|- align="center" bgcolor="#FFBBBB"
| 48 || 1 || @ Detroit Red Wings || 3–2 || 13–20–15
|- align="center" bgcolor="white"
| 49 || 4 || @ Chicago Black Hawks || 4–4 || 13–20–16
|- align="center" bgcolor="white"
| 50 || 7 || @ Boston Bruins || 2–2 || 13–20–17
|- align="center" bgcolor="#CCFFCC"
| 51 || 11 || Montreal Canadiens || 3–1 || 14–20–17
|- align="center" bgcolor="#CCFFCC"
| 52 || 14 || Chicago Black Hawks || 5–1 || 15–20–17
|- align="center" bgcolor="#CCFFCC"
| 53 || 15 || @ Chicago Black Hawks || 7–3 || 16–20–17
|- align="center" bgcolor="#FFBBBB"
| 54 || 17 || @ Toronto Maple Leafs || 2–0 || 16–21–17
|- align="center" bgcolor="#FFBBBB"
| 55 || 18 || Toronto Maple Leafs || 5–2 || 16–22–17
|- align="center" bgcolor="white"
| 56 || 21 || Boston Bruins || 2–2 || 16–22–18
|- align="center" bgcolor="#FFBBBB"
| 57 || 24 || @ Montreal Canadiens || 6–2 || 16–23–18
|- align="center" bgcolor="#CCFFCC"
| 58 || 25 || Detroit Red Wings || 6–2 || 17–23–18
|-

|- align="center" bgcolor="#CCFFCC"
| 59 || 1 || @ Chicago Black Hawks || 4–1 || 18–23–18
|- align="center" bgcolor="white"
| 60 || 3 || @ Boston Bruins || 3–3 || 18–23–19
|- align="center" bgcolor="white"
| 61 || 4 || Montreal Canadiens || 2–2 || 18–23–20
|- align="center" bgcolor="#CCFFCC"
| 62 || 7 || Chicago Black Hawks || 3–1 || 19–23–20
|- align="center" bgcolor="#FFBBBB"
| 63 || 10 || @ Detroit Red Wings || 3–2 || 19–24–20
|- align="center" bgcolor="white"
| 64 || 11 || Montreal Canadiens || 5–5 || 19–24–21
|- align="center" bgcolor="#FFBBBB"
| 65 || 14 || Toronto Maple Leafs || 3–1 || 19–25–21
|- align="center" bgcolor="#FFBBBB"
| 66 || 15 || @ Montreal Canadiens || 5–3 || 19–26–21
|- align="center" bgcolor="#FFBBBB"
| 67 || 17 || @ Toronto Maple Leafs || 3–1 || 19–27–21
|- align="center" bgcolor="#FFBBBB"
| 68 || 18 || Toronto Maple Leafs || 4–1 || 19–28–21
|- align="center" bgcolor="#FFBBBB"
| 69 || 21 || Detroit Red Wings || 4–1 || 19–29–21
|- align="center" bgcolor="#CCFFCC"
| 70 || 25 || Chicago Black Hawks || 5–2 || 20–29–21
|-

Playoffs
The Rangers failed to qualify for the 1951 Stanley Cup playoffs.

Player statistics
Skaters

Goaltenders

†Denotes player spent time with another team before joining Rangers. Stats reflect time with Rangers only.
‡Traded mid-season. Stats reflect time with Rangers only.

Awards and records

Transactions

See also
 1950–51 NHL season

References

New York Rangers seasons
New York Rangers
New York Rangers
New York Rangers
New York Rangers
Madison Square Garden
1950s in Manhattan